Donald Bradley Somervell, Baron Somervell of Harrow,  (24 August 1889 – 18 November 1960) was a British barrister, judge and Conservative Party politician. He served as Solicitor General and Attorney General from 1933 to 1945 and was briefly Home Secretary in Winston Churchill's 1945 caretaker government.

Background, education and legal career
Somervell was the son of Robert Somervell, master and bursar of Harrow School, and was educated at Harrow before reading Chemistry with a demyship at Magdalen College, Oxford, graduating with a First in 1911. In 1912 he was elected a prize fellow of All Souls College, Oxford, the first chemist to be elected. He then joined the Inner Temple, but his legal training was interrupted by the outbreak of the First World War. Commissioned into the British Army, he served with the Middlesex Regiment and the 53rd Brigade in India and Mesopotamia. For his war service, he was appointed OBE in 1919.

Having been called to the bar in absentia in 1916, he completed his pupillage and practiced in the chambers of William Jowitt, specialising in commercial law matters arising out of the Treaty of Versailles. He became King's Counsel in 1929.

Political career
In 1929 he entered politics. Although supporting the Liberal Party by inclination, its decline and his admiration for Prime Minister Stanley Baldwin led him to join the Conservative Party. He stood unsuccessfully for Crewe in the 1929 general election. He won the seat in the 1931 election and held it for 14 years.

In 1933, he became Solicitor General, receiving the customary knighthood, followed three years later by a promotion to Attorney General. In the latter post, he served for nine years during which he oversaw crises such as the Abdication Crisis of Edward VIII. He was the longest-serving Attorney General since 1754. He was sworn of the Privy Council in the 1938 Birthday Honours. He was Recorder of Kingston upon Thames from 1940 to 1946.

In 1945, he was briefly Home Secretary in Winston Churchill's caretaker government. Both the government and Somervell were defeated in that year's general election.

Judicial career
In 1946, Somervell was made a Lord Justice of Appeal by Clement Attlee. In 1951 Churchill returned to power but passed over Somervell's claims to the Lord Chancellorship. On 4 October 1954 Somervell became a Lord of Appeal in Ordinary and, as a Law Lord, he received a life peerage as Baron Somervell of Harrow, of Ewelme in the County of Oxford. He retired in 1960, shortly before his death.

Family

Somervell married Loelia Helen Buchan-Hepburn, daughter of Sir Archibald Buchan-Hepburn, 4th Baronet, in 1933. She died in July 1945, aged 48. Somervell survived her by fifteen years and died in November 1960, aged 71. His grave can be found in the grounds of Saint Mary's Church in Ewelme, opposite that of the writer Jerome K. Jerome.

Arms

References

External links 
 

1889 births
Somervell, Donald Bradley, Baron
Alumni of Magdalen College, Oxford
Attorneys General for England and Wales
British Secretaries of State
Conservative Party (UK) MPs for English constituencies
English King's Counsel
Fellows of All Souls College, Oxford
Knights Bachelor
Somervell of Harrow
Members of the Judicial Committee of the Privy Council
Members of the Privy Council of the United Kingdom
Middlesex Regiment officers
Ministers in the Chamberlain peacetime government, 1937–1939
Ministers in the Chamberlain wartime government, 1939–1940
Ministers in the Churchill caretaker government, 1945
Ministers in the Churchill wartime government, 1940–1945
Officers of the Order of the British Empire
Secretaries of State for the Home Department
Solicitors General for England and Wales
UK MPs 1931–1935
UK MPs 1935–1945
UK MPs who were granted peerages
20th-century English lawyers
People educated at Harrow School